The 2020 OFC Champions League was the 19th edition of the Oceanian Club Championship, Oceania's premier club football tournament organized by the Oceania Football Confederation (OFC), and the 14th season under the current OFC Champions League name.

The tournament was suspended in March 2020 after the group stage due to the COVID-19 pandemic. On 4 September 2020, the OFC announced that the tournament was abandoned due to the border and travel restrictions caused by the COVID-19 pandemic, and no champions would be awarded. The OFC representative at the 2020 FIFA Club World Cup in Qatar, which would originally be the winners of the 2020 OFC Champions League, was confirmed to be Auckland City on 19 November 2020 following a decision by the OFC Executive Committee, based on the principles within the competition regulations of the OFC Champions League which established a ranking of each team after the group stage, which was topped by Auckland City. However, on 15 January 2021, FIFA announced that Auckland City had withdrawn from the competition due to the COVID-19 pandemic and related quarantine measures required by the New Zealand authorities, meaning that no OFC representatives competed in the tournament.

Hienghène Sport were the defending champions, but were eliminated in the group stage.

Teams

A total of 18 teams from all 11 OFC member associations entered the competition.
The seven developed associations (Fiji, New Caledonia, New Zealand, Papua New Guinea, Solomon Islands, Tahiti, Vanuatu) were awarded two berths each in the group stage.
The four developing associations (American Samoa, Cook Islands, Samoa, Tonga) were awarded one berth each in the qualifying stage, with the winners and runners-up advancing to the group stage.

Notes

Schedule
The schedule of the competition is as follows. For this season, the qualifying stage was originally brought forward from January 2020 to December 2019 to coincide with the end of the participating Member Associations' national league seasons, and to be played in Samoa. However, it was later delayed to January 2020 and moved to New Zealand.

On 9 March 2020, the OFC announced that all OFC tournaments were postponed until 6 May 2020 due to the COVID-19 pandemic. On 14 May 2020, it was announced that the quarter-finals had been postponed until September 2020 at the earliest. On 28 July 2020, the OFC announced that the knockout matches would take place at a single location, with the decision of the dates and venue to be made by the OFC Executive Committee on 31 August 2020. On 4 September 2020, the OFC announced that the tournament was abandoned.

Qualifying stage

Group stage

Group A

Group B

Group C

Group D

Knockout stage

Qualified teams
The winners and runners-up of each of the four groups in the group stage would have played in the knockout stage, before it was cancelled.

Qualification to FIFA Club World Cup
Due to the abandonment of the tournament, the OFC decided to nominate the team with the best record in the group stage as their representative at the 2020 FIFA Club World Cup.

Top goalscorers

References

External links
OFC Champions League 2020, oceaniafootball.com
News > OFC Champions League 2020

 
2020
1
Association football events curtailed and voided due to the COVID-19 pandemic